Czechoslovakia competed at the 1952 Summer Olympics in Helsinki, Finland. 99 competitors, 86 men and 13 women, took part in 70 events in 11 sports.

Medalists

Athletics

Basketball

Men's Team Competition
Main Round (Group A)
 Lost to Uruguay (51-53)
 Lost to United States (47-72)
 Defeated Hungary (63-39) → did not advance, 12th place
Team Roster
Miroslav Baumruk
Zdeněk Bobrovský
Josef Ezr
Jiří Matoušek
Miroslav Škeřík
Mcheq Kodl
Jan Kozák
Evžen Horňák
Zdeněk Rylich
Lubomir Kolár
Ivan Mrázek
Jaroslav Šíp

Boxing

Canoeing

Cycling

Road Competition

Men's Individual Road Race (190.4 km)
Jan Veselý — did not finish (→ no ranking)
Karel Nesl — did not finish (→ no ranking)
Milan Perič — did not finish (→ no ranking)
Stanislav Svoboda — did not finish (→ no ranking)

Track Competition

Men's 1.000m Time Trial
Ladislav Fouček
 Final — 1:15.2 (→ 12th place)

Men's 1.000m Sprint Scratch Race
Zdenek Košta — 18th place

Gymnastics

Rowing

Czechoslovakia had eight male rowers participate in three out of seven rowing events in 1952.

 Men's single sculls
 František Reich

 Men's double sculls
 Antonín Malinkovič
 Jiří Vykoukal

 Men's coxed four
 Karel Mejta
 Jiří Havlis
 Jan Jindra
 Stanislav Lusk
 Miroslav Koranda (cox)

Shooting

Six shooters represented Czechoslovakia in 1952.

25 m pistol
 Ladislav Ondřej
 Zlatko Poláček

50 m pistol
 František Maxa
 Miroslav Proft

Trap
 František Čapek
 Igor Treybal

Swimming

Weightlifting

Wrestling

References

External links
Official Olympic Reports
International Olympic Committee results database

Nations at the 1952 Summer Olympics
1952
Summer Olympics